Hood 2 Hood: The Blockumentary is a straight-to-DVD documentary about the subculture of inner-city street gangs in American neighborhoods, released in 2005. It was produced by Rich Kid Entertainment.

Overview
The documentary takes a tour through American neighborhoods with high crime rates. Street gangs allowed Rich Kid Entertainment to capture the day-to-day actions of life in gang-ridden neighborhoods.

Rich Kid Entertainment traveled to over 29 different cities and neighborhoods which included the hoods that many music artists grew up in, such as Jay-Z, Eminem, Nelly, Eazy-E, Mac Dre, Michael Jackson, Three 6 Mafia, Geto Boys, Big Pun, Juvenile, T.I. and Nas.

Cities included

Atlanta, GA
Oakland, CA
Richmond, CA
Sacramento, CA
San Francisco, CA
Vallejo, CA
Baltimore, MD
New York, NY
Birmingham, AL
Chicago, IL
Milwaukee, WI
Compton, CA
Detroit, MI
Los Angeles, CA
Gary, IN
Harlem, NY
Houston, TX
Jackson, MS
Kansas City, KS
Kansas City, MO
Las Vegas, NV
Little Rock, AR
Memphis, TN
New Orleans, LA
Omaha, NE
Philadelphia, PA
St Louis, MO
Washington, DC

Post release 
The documentary aided police in investigation work against gangs. A Las Vegas man, an alleged member of the Gerson Park Kingsmen, has been charged with murder, attempted murder and conspiracy to commit murder.

Sequel
A sequel titled Hood 2 Hood 2: The Blockumentary was released on July 8, 2008. Part three was released in 2013.

See also
Gangs in the United States

References

External links

Mondo films
American documentary films
Documentary films about African-American gangs
2000s hip hop films
Crips
Bloods
2005 documentary films
2005 films
2000s English-language films
2000s American films